Pool 1 of the Second Round of the 2013 World Baseball Classic was held at Tokyo Dome, Tokyo, Japan from March 8 to 12, 2013.

Pool 1 was a modified double-elimination tournament. The winners for the first games matched up in the second game, while the losers faced each other in an elimination game. The winners of the elimination game then played the losers of the non-elimination game in another elimination game. The remaining two teams then played each other to determine seeding for the semifinals.

Bracket

Pool 1 MVP:  Hirokazu Ibata

Results
All times are Japan Standard Time (UTC+09:00).

Netherlands 6, Cuba 2

Japan 4, Chinese Taipei 3

Cuba 14, Chinese Taipei 0

Japan 16, Netherlands 4

Netherlands 7, Cuba 6

Japan 10, Netherlands 6

References

External links
Official website

Pool 1
World Baseball Classic Pool 1
World Baseball Classic Pool 1
International baseball competitions hosted by Japan
World Baseball Classic Pool 1
Sports competitions in Tokyo